The 1902 Chicago Maroons football team was an American football team that represented the University of Chicago during the 1902 Western Conference football season.  In their 11th season under head coach Amos Alonzo Stagg, the Maroons compiled a 14–1 record, shut out 12 opponents, finished in second place in the Western Conference with a 5–1 record against conference opponents, and outscored all opponents by a combined total of 297 to 32.

Schedule

Roster

Head Coach: Amos Alonzo Stagg (11th year at Chicago)

References

Chicago
Chicago Maroons football seasons
Chicago Maroons football